The Michigan Baseball Foundation (MBF) is a 501(c)(3) non-profit organization in Midland, Michigan, that refers to itself as a social enterprise.  MBF is the current owner and operator of the Dow Diamond – a baseball stadium located in downtown Midland. Profits from the operation of the Dow Diamond are donated to youth groups and to initiatives that seek to improve life in Midland and its surrounding areas.

History
MBF began in 2005, when William S. Stavropoulos, then Chairman of the Dow Chemical Company, which is headquartered in Midland, came up with the idea that minor league baseball could help to vitalize the hometown of Dow Chemical. He had observed how the introduction of minor league baseball had rejuvenated several communities in the United States, and he felt it could similarly trigger a renaissance in Midland.

With the backing of Dow Chemical he turned to citizens of the town for their support. Ultimately, five additional Midland-based organizations (Dow Corning Corporation, the Charles J. Strosacker Foundation, the Rollin M. Gerstacker Foundation, the Herbert H. and Grace A. Dow Foundation, and the Bill and Linda Stavropoulos Foundation)   joined Dow in backing the effort to bring a minor league baseball team to the community. MBF was formed and Stavropoulos was asked to serve as its CEO and Chairman.

In the beginning MBF’s founders expected the new organization to serve as the owner of both a future minor league team and a baseball stadium. They envisioned that MBF would function as a social enterprise – a tax free non-profit that invests its earnings in charitable activities.

In 2005 MBF hired Tom Dickson, owner of the Lansing Lugnuts minor league team, as a consultant, and through him in September 2005 MBF negotiated the purchase of the Southwest Michigan Devil Rays of nearby Battle Creek, Michigan. As MBF awaited approval of the sale by the Midwest League, it sought to register with the federal Internal Revenue Service (IRS) as a 501(c)(3) non-profit.  The IRS was unwilling to grant a professional baseball team a tax-free status. As a result, MBF’s founders created the Michigan Baseball Operation (MBO) – a separate, independent taxable non-profit – and MBO became the owner of the Devil Rays in early 2006, when the purchase of the team was finalized.

During the 2006 baseball season, the Devil Rays continued to play in Battle Creek, while a stadium was being built for them in Midland. At the end of the season the team’s name was changed to the Great Lakes Loons.

Meanwhile rapid progress was made in constructing a ballpark in Midland. On April 11, 2006, MBF started construction of the stadium on land in downtown Midland that had been donated by Dow Chemical.  Dow also paid for the naming rights to the new ballpark, which became known as the Dow Diamond.  Construction ended in early 2007, in time so that the Great Lakes Loons could take the field for their first home game on April 13.

Construction of the Dow Diamond cost $34 million, more than the average for a minor league stadium.  However, the Dow Diamond is fitted out with many attributes and amenities not generally associated with minor league baseball, e.g., a solar panel powered scoreboard, water bottle fill-up stations, a concourse that can be enclosed for events, and free WiFi available everywhere.  In 2007 Ballpark Digest recognized the Dow Diamond as the best ballpark of the year.  Stadium Journey has consistently given it high ratings.

Current activities
Today MBF is earning revenues from the operation of the Dow Diamond as both a baseball stadium and as a venue for many different private events, such as wedding receptions, concerts, and meetings.  MBF donates profits from the Dow Diamond to support such youth organizations as a girls softball league, the local 4-H association, and the Midland soccer club.  In addition, it provides funding for economic development and community improvement. For example, it is a key supporter of Momentum Midland,  a group of projects presently underway that aim to improve Midland’s downtown area. Within the framework of Momentum Midland public recreational facilities are being built along the Tittabawassee River; pedestrian and bike access is being created to downtown Midland, and business activity is being encouraged in the downtown area.

References

External links
Michigan Baseball Foundation – Great Lakes Bay Region
Great Lakes Loons

Midland, Michigan
Baseball organizations
501(c)(3) organizations
Social enterprises